South Parish is the historic name of a church at 292 State Street in Portsmouth, New Hampshire, in the United States. The church building, built in 1824-26, is one of the earliest examples of Classical Revival architecture in New England, and was listed on the National Register of Historic Places in 1979.

Now known as South Church or South Unitarian Universalist Church, the congregation is a covenanting member of the Unitarian Universalist Association, and is an accredited Green Sanctuary. Unitarian Universalism is a liberal religion with Jewish-Christian roots. It has no creed. It affirms the worth of human beings, advocates freedom of belief and the search for advancing truth, and tries to provide a warm, open, supportive community for people who believe that ethical living is the supreme witness of religion. The church is a Welcoming Congregation for bisexual, gay, lesbian, and transgender people.

Architecture and history
The South Parish church is located in downtown Portsmouth, at the southwest corner of State and Church streets. It is a single-story masonry structure, fashioned out of ashlar granite blocks quarried in Rockport, Massachusetts. Its gabled roof has a single-stage square belfry, topped by a low-pitch hip roof. The front facade is dominated by a four-column pedimented portico, with Tuscan columns for support. There are three entrance bays, articulated by simple pilasters. The side windows are set in round-arch openings. The interior consists of an entrance vestibule, with a single large sanctuary chamber beyond. The roof is supported by scissor trusses composed of massive timbers. The interior decorations are reflective of an 1858 enlargement and redecorating.

The church was built in 1824-26. It is the first substantial stone structure to be built in northern New England, and is an early example of the large-scale use of granite in New England architecture. Its neoclassical Greek Revival elements are a precursor to later Greek Revival structures built in the city.

See also
National Register of Historic Places listings in Rockingham County, New Hampshire

References

External links
South Church website

Unitarian Universalist churches in New Hampshire
Churches on the National Register of Historic Places in New Hampshire
Churches completed in 1826
Churches in Rockingham County, New Hampshire
Buildings and structures in Portsmouth, New Hampshire
1826 establishments in New Hampshire
National Register of Historic Places in Portsmouth, New Hampshire